Frecciargento is a high-speed train of the Italian national train operator, Trenitalia, as one of its Le Frecce brands (along with Frecciarossa and Frecciabianca). The name, which means "Silver Arrow", was introduced in 2012; these trains were previously branded as Eurostar Italia.

In May 2022, it was announced by Trenitalia's CEO Luigi Corradi that, starting from summer 2022, the Frecciargento brand will be phased out. The trains that operate as Frecciargento will be incorporated, with a change of livery, into the Frecciarossa service.

Routes
 Rome – Naples – Salerno – Lamezia Terme – Reggio di Calabria
 Udine – Venice – Padua – Bologna – Florence – Rome
 Trieste – Venice – Padua – Bologna – Florence – Rome
 Bolzano/Bozen – Verona – Bologna – Florence – Rome
 Bergamo – Brescia – Verona – Bologna – Florence – Rome
 Mantua – Modena – Bologna – Rome
 Rome – Caserta – Benevento – Foggia – Bari – Lecce
 Genoa – La Spezia – Pisa – Florence – Rome
Milano – Bologna – Rimini – Ancona

Rolling stock
 ETR 485: tilting trains, speeds up to 
 ETR 600: tilting trains, speeds up to 
ETR 610: tilting trains with international signal system capability, speeds up to 
ETR 700: non-tilting trains, speeds up to

See also
Frecciabianca
Frecciarossa
High-speed rail in Italy
Eurostar Italia
Train categories in Europe

References

External links

High-speed rail in Italy
Ferrovie dello Stato Italiane
Train-related introductions in 2012